Oaklands is a town in the Riverina district of southern New South Wales, Australia. The town is located 615 kilometres south west of the state capital, Sydney and 105 kilometres north west of Albury.

Oaklands has a pub, bowls club, swimming pool, Kindergarten to Year 12 school, and day-care.

History
The earliest settlement in the district of Oaklands was by the Tyson brothers, James and William, in 1846. 
   
Oaklands Post Office opened on 16 June 1890.

The major industry in the Oaklands region is agriculture, including the production of wheat and rice and is a major grain handling area.  It is the home of the Oaklands Diuris, a threatened native orchid that is currently only found in the Oaklands region.

Rail 
A standard gauge branch line from the New South Wales Government Railways Main South line at The Rock was extended from Lockhart to Oaklands in 1912.

A broad gauge branch line from the Victorian Railways North East line at Benalla was extended from Yarrawonga to Oaklands in 1938, creating a break-of-gauge until the New South Wales line was closed south of Boree Creek. There are several stations between Yarrawonga and Oaklands.

With the conversion of the North East railway to Albury to standard gauge in 2008, the Oaklands branch railway was for a time a gauge orphan.

Oaklands is located 313 km from Melbourne and 675 km from Sydney.

Gallery

References

External links 

Towns in the Riverina
Towns in New South Wales
Federation Council, New South Wales